Dhupchanchia Upazila is an upazila of Bogra District in the Division of Rajshahi, Bangladesh. Dhupchanchia Thana was established in 1880 and was converted into an upazila in 1983. It is named after its administrative center, the town of Dhupchanchia.

Geography
It is bounded on the east by the Nagar River (across which lies Kahaloo Upazila). It borders Adamdighi Upazila to the south and west, Joypurhat District to the west and north, and Shibganj Upazila to the northeast.

Demographics

According to the 2011 Bangladesh census, Dhupchanchia Upazila had 45,390 households and a population of 176,678, 12.7% of whom lived in urban areas. 8.7% of the population was under the age of 5. The literacy rate (age 7 and over) was 51.7%, compared to the national average of 51.8%.

Economy

Hats and bazar
Hats and bazars are 15, the most noted of which are Dhap sultangonj Hat, Taluch Hat, Zianagar Hat, Talora Hat, and Saharpukur Hat, Chowmohoni Hat and Bazar.
And bazars are open every day, the most noted bazar are tematha puraton bazar, c.o office bazar etc.

Main exports
Paddy, rice, potato, biscuit, fish, milk, wood, vegetables etc.

Points of interest
 Dargah of Sultan Shahi Sawar Dhap
 Gobindapur Temple
 Goyabandh Mazar
 Mazar of Pir Ziauddin

Administration
Dhupchanchia Upazila is divided into two municipalities and six union parishads: Chamrul, Dhupchanchia, Gobindapur, Gunahar, Talora, and Zianagar. The union parishads are subdivided into 108 mauzas and 212 villages.

Dupchanchia Municipality was established in 2000. It has 9 wards and 37 mahallas. Md. Jahangir Alom (Bangladesh National Party) was elected mayor in 2008.

Talora Municipalicity was established in 2013.

Infrastructure

Transport
Railway stations Altafnagar and Talora are on the branch line connecting Santahar and Kaunia. In July 2014 they were served by six or eight intercity and six mail trains a day.

Health centres
Upazila health complex 1, rural health centre 1, satellite clinic 1, family welfare centre 5.

Education

According to Banglapedia, Talora Altaf Ali High School, founded in 1918, Dupchanchia Pilot High School, founded in 1923, and Dupchanchia Pilot Girls' High School, founded in 1910, are notable secondary schools.
There are six colleges in the upazila. They include Dupchanchia J.K. Degree College, and Shahid M Monsur Ali College. Dupchanchia Mohila Degree College, founded in 1993, is the only honors level college in the upazila.

The madrasa education system includes four fazil madrasas.

See also

Upazilas of Bangladesh
Districts of Bangladesh
Divisions of Bangladesh

References

Upazilas of Bogra District